Munsterman is a surname. Notable people with the surname include:

Marthe Munsterman (born 1993), Dutch women's footballer
Scott Munsterman (born 1961), American politician

See also
Münstermann